The LC Linked Data Service is an initiative of the Library of Congress that publishes authority data as linked data.
It is commonly referred to by its URI: id.loc.gov.

The first offering of the LC Linked Data Service was the Library of Congress Subject Headings (LCSH) dataset, which was released in April 2009.

Datasets
 Library of Congress Subject Headings (LCSH)
 Library of Congress Name Authority File (LCNAF)
 Library of Congress Classification—because LC Classification uses a different MARC format than LC Authorities, mapping LC Classification to MADS/RDF was more difficult than mapping LCSH or LCNAF.
 Library of Congress Thesaurus for Graphic Materials
 Various MARC codes
 Various preservation vocabularies

Formats
The service presents data in MADS/RDF and SKOS where appropriate, but also uses its own ontology to describe classification resources and relationships more accurately.  All records are available individually via content negotiation as XHTML/RDFa, RDF/XML, N-Triples, and JSON.

Each vocabulary is also available to download in its entirety. Id.loc.gov does not currently provide a SPARQL endpoint.

Uses

Technical aspects
The id.loc.gov site initially used a fairly lightweight Python program to serve linked data.

See also
 Authority control
 BIBFRAME
  (PND)
 Virtual International Authority File (VIAF)

References

External links
 LC Linked Data Service

Semantic Web
Knowledge bases
Library of Congress